Barsam is a surname. Notable people with the surname include:

 Allon Barsam (born 1977), London-based ophthalmologist
 Richard Barsam (born 1938), American author and film historian

See also 
 Barsamian
 Barsamin